The Magnetic Hill is an example of a gravity hill, a type of optical illusion created by rising and descending terrain. It is located at the northwestern edge (in the Magnetic Hill Area) of the city of Moncton in the Canadian province of New Brunswick.

The general area is at the base of a ridge named "Lutes Mountain", which rises several hundred feet above the surrounding Petitcodiac River valley.

History

In the 19th century, a cart path was built from the city in the south onto the ridge. The path was subsequently expanded during the early 20th century and during the age of the automobile, ca. 1931, it was noticed that at one point near the base of the ridge when driving south, motorists were required to accelerate in order to prevent rolling backward (i.e., what appears to be uphill). The novelty became known as "Magnetic Hill" and was more-or-less an amusing local attraction for residents and visitors to try.

Eventually with the rise in tourism after the Second World War, along with local highway construction which saw a "Mountain Road" bypass built further west from Magnetic Hill, the roughly 1 kilometre segment of gravel road became one of Moncton's prime tourist attractions (along with the tidal bore on the Petitcodiac River).  Magnetic Hill is now a historic property.

To experience Magnetic Hill today, drivers must pay up some money to drive their cars to the end of the road (which has been preserved). When a car is placed in neutral, it will begin to roll backwards, apparently uphill. Observers will also note that water in the adjacent drainage ditches also seemingly runs "uphill."

Magnetic Hill is one of several Canadian icons mentioned in the Stompin' Tom Connors song "Cross Canada", later covered (as "C-A-N-A-D-A") by Raffi on his Bananaphone album.

See also
List of gravity hills around the world 
 Magnetic Hill Concert Site
 Magnetic Hill Area
 Magnetic Hill Zoo
 Magic Mountain
 List of magnetic hills
 Gravity hill
 Lutes Mountain, New Brunswick

References

External links

Gravity hills
Roadside attractions in Canada
Parks in Moncton
Tourist attractions in Moncton
Heritage sites in New Brunswick
Hills of Canada